William Gamble (5 November 1798 in Leicester – 10 August 1855 in Leicester) was an English cricketer who was associated with Leicester Cricket Club from 1821 to 1829 and made his first-class debut in 1828.

References

Bibliography
 

1798 births
1855 deaths
English cricketers
English cricketers of 1826 to 1863
Leicestershire cricketers